Five Star Bank may refer to:

 Five Star Bank (California)
 Five Star Bank (New York)